Power alley is a term used in audio engineering to denote the line between subwoofers where output from each subwoofer is in phase and is noticeably louder.

Problem
Subwoofers placed at each side of the stage will typically cancel unpredictably everywhere in the listening area except along the center line between the speakers.  Because of this, placing subwoofer cabinets together tends to give a smoother response to each member of the audience. 
This is explained in detail in "The Power Alley ".

Solution
Centering the subwoofers between the high end cabinets tends to minimize the timing 
error throughout the listening area. The effects of separated subwoofers are more predictable outdoors, but subwoofers are often placed together as a starting point for indoor venues, too.

References

Audio engineering
Loudspeakers